Synnott is  a surname and may refer to

 Bob Synnott (1912–1985), American basketball player
 Del Synnott (born 1977), Irish actor
 Frank Synnott (1890–1945), Canadian ice hockey player
 Hilary Synnott (1945–2011), British diplomat
 Noel Synnott (born 1951), Irish football player
 Stephen P. Synnott (born 1946), American astronomer and Voyager scientist
 William R. Synnott (1929–2010), American organizational theorist

See also 
 Sinnott